Horace Thomas Johnson (30 December 1886 – 12 August 1966) was a cyclist from  Great Britain. He was born in Fulham, United Kingdom.

Johnson was often referred to as Tiny Johnson or H. T. Tiny Johnson. He won three silver medals at the Olympic games: the tandem race at the 1908 Summer Olympics in London, plus both the individual sprint the team pursuit at the 1920 Summer Olympics in Antwerp, Belgium.

Career
Johnson took up cycle racing in 1905 when he joined Putney A.C. at the age of 17. By the age of 20, in 1908, he won a silver medal at the 1908 Summer Olympics in London, competing with Frederick (E.G.) Hamlin in the 2,000 metre tandem race.
  
In 1911 he won 32 races in top-class company.

At the 1920 Summer Olympics held in Antwerp, he won the silver medal after finishing second in the 1,000 metre individual sprint with a time of 15.1 seconds, identical to Harry Ryan who was awarded the bronze medal. The following day, 10 August, Johnson was a member of the British team in the Men's team pursuit. The team, which also included Cyril Alden, William Stewart, and Albert White, finished in the silver medal position with a time of 5 minutes 13.8 seconds.

In 1922, at the World Amateur Track Championships in Paris, he won the men's sprint title, beating the Olympic champion Maurice Peeters and teammate W. Ormston.

Awards

Golden Book

Johnson's achievements were celebrated in 1949 when Cycling Weekly awarded him his own page in the Golden Book of Cycling.

References

1886 births
1966 deaths
English male cyclists
Olympic cyclists of Great Britain
Olympic silver medallists for Great Britain
Cyclists at the 1908 Summer Olympics
Cyclists at the 1920 Summer Olympics
Olympic medalists in cycling
Medalists at the 1908 Summer Olympics
Medalists at the 1920 Summer Olympics
People from Fulham
Cyclists from Greater London
Place of death missing
20th-century British people